"Tuesday" is the debut single by American rapper ILoveMakonnen, released on September 1, 2014. The song, which was produced by frequent collaborators Sonny Digital and Metro Boomin, originally mixed by Justin Childs, and features guest vocals by Ousala Aleem and from Canadian rapper Drake, was released as the first single from his debut extended play (EP), ILoveMakonnen (2014). On March 4, 2015, "Tuesday" was certified platinum by the RIAA, with over 1 million sales. There is also an unofficial freestyle to Tuesday by American rapper Fetty Wap and The Remy Boyz released October 14, 2014

Background
On August 12, 2014, Canadian rapper Drake released a remix to the original version of Makonnen's song, titled "Club Goin' Up on a Tuesday". On August 31, 2014, it was reported Makonnen signed a recording contract with Drake's record label, OVO Sound. Drake changed the song title to "Tuesday". Drake got in touch with Sonny Digital; the rapper released the remix two days later. On this release, Makonnen said "It was great. I was excited."

Reception
The website Pitchfork awarded a "Best New Track" mention to Drake's remix of the song. In the track review, Patrick Fallon concluded "Somehow, this summertime sleeper hit has become a self-fulfilling prophecy: iLoveMakonnen worked tirelessly to get to this point in his career, and now with a proper success... he can finally party like it's a Tuesday." "Tuesday" placed second in the magazine's year-end list. The song was also named 2nd best song of 2014 by Spin, noting "There's never been a radio hit quite like it before, with the cadence and brio of hip-hop, the musicality and patience of R&B — good R&B, at that — and the strobe-lit sonics and spaciousness of EDM." It was also listed at number 21 on Fader's list of the 116 best tracks of the year. In January 2015, "Tuesday" was ranked at number six on The Village Voices annual year-end Pazz & Jop critics' poll. The remix featuring Drake received a nomination for Best Rap/Sung Collaboration at the 57th Annual Grammy Awards.

Music video
The song's accompanying music video premiered on October 20, 2014 on iLoveMakonnen's YouTube account. Since its release, the music video has received over 200 million views on YouTube.

Charts

Weekly charts

Year-end charts

Release history

Burak Yeter and Danelle Sandoval version

"Tuesday" was later recorded by Turkish DJ/producer Burak Yeter and American singer-songwriter Danelle Sandoval. It was originally recorded by Sandoval and then remixed by Yeter. The song was released as a digital download in the UK on 12 August 2016 through Warner Music Group.

Music video
A music video to accompany the release of "Tuesday" was first released onto YouTube on 16 July 2016 at a total length of three minutes and eleven seconds.

Track listing

Charts and certifications

Weekly charts

Year-end charts

Certifications

Release history

References

External links

2014 songs
2014 debut singles
2016 singles
ILoveMakonnen songs
Drake (musician) songs
Songs written by iLoveMakonnen
Songs written by Drake (musician)
OVO Sound singles
Warner Records singles
Songs written by Metro Boomin
Songs written by Sonny Digital
Song recordings produced by Metro Boomin
Number-one singles in Russia
Cloud rap songs
Alternative R&B songs